Esenbeckia alata is a species of flowering plant in the citrus family, Rutaceae, that is endemic to Colombia. Common names include Winged Esenbeckia, Coya, and Cuala-cuala.

References

alata
Endemic flora of Colombia
Plants described in 1872
Endangered plants
Taxonomy articles created by Polbot